"Tuesday Morning" is a song recorded by The Pogues. It was released in 1993 as a single from their first post-Shane Macgowan album, Waiting for Herb. It was the band's last single to make the UK top 20, and the first single to feature Spider Stacy on vocals. The song itself was composed by Stacy. It reached Number 18 in the UK singles charts and also culminated in their last performance on Top of the Pops.

It is also their most successful single internationally and peaked at #11 on the Billboard Modern Rock Tracks chart

The accompanying video featured clips from Pogues videos from down the years.

References

1993 singles
The Pogues songs
Folk rock songs
1993 songs